Local elections were held in Kenya on 4 March 2013 as part of the general elections. Voters elected governors and members of County Assemblies of the 47 counties created by the 2010 constitution.

Electoral system
Kenyan law requires governors to have a recognised university degree. This clause resulted in challenges for aspirants including Soita Shitanda in Kakamenga and Margaret Wanjiru in Nairobi

County Representative were elected in single member wards, of which there were a total of 1,450. Several County Representatives were also nominated to represent youths and disabled people in the various county assemblies from party lists, and after the elections 680 women were also nominated to the various county assemblies to ensure gender balance.

Results

Governors

 Cornel Rasanga's election as Siaya governor was nullified in August 2013 following a petition at the High Court in Kisumu. He won the subsequent by-election and was sworn in again as governor.

By party

References

2013
 
March 2013 events in Africa